Mary Souza is a Republican member of the Idaho Senate and former nurse. She was first elected in 2014.

Controversies 
In 2015, she co-sponsored a bill that would allow parents to withdraw their children from any activity that "impairs the parents’ firmly held beliefs, values or principles."

In December 2020, Souza signed on to an Amicus Brief in support of Texas' attempts to overturn the results of the Presidential election in Georgia, Michigan, Pennsylvania, and Wisconsin.

Political positions
Souza is opposed to the Patient Protection and Affordable Care Act (Obamacare) and is also opposed to expanding Medicaid.

In the 2022 elections, Souza ran for Secretary of State of Idaho. Souza made baseless claims of voter fraud, echoing Donald Trump's baseless claims of voter fraud in the 2020 United States presidential election. Souza lost the race to Phil McGrane.

Personal life
Souza and her husband, Rick, have four children and two grandchildren. They reside in Coeur d'Alene, Idaho.

Electoral history

References

External links
 
 Blog
 Campaign website

Year of birth missing (living people)
Place of birth missing (living people)
Living people
Republican Party Idaho state senators
People from Coeur d'Alene, Idaho
Women state legislators in Idaho
Brigham Young University alumni
American nurses
American women nurses
21st-century American politicians
21st-century American women politicians